The Mazzatello (abbreviated mazza), more properly mazzolatura (to hit with a mace), was a method of capital punishment occasionallly used by the Papal States for the most loathsome crimes, involving the infliction of head trauma. The method was named after the implement used in the execution: a large, long-handled mallet or pollaxe. The last reported use of this form of punishment was in September 1806: the much more common capital punishments inflicted by the Papal States were hanging or beheading. According to author Geoffrey Abbott, mazzatello constituted "one of the most brutal methods of execution ever devised, requiring minimal skill on the part of the executioner and superhuman acquiescence by the victim". Megivern cites mazzatello as one example of an execution method devised by the Papal States that "competed with and in some instances surpassed those of other regimes for cruelty".

The condemned would be led to a scaffold in a public square of Rome, accompanied by a priest (the confessor of the condemned); the platform also contained a coffin and the masked executioner, dressed in black. A prayer would first be said for the condemned's soul. Then, the mallet would be raised, swung through the air to gain momentum, and then brought down on the head of the prisoner, similar to a contemporary method of slaughtering cattle in stockyards. The condemned was usually knocked unconscious rather than being killed instantly, so the throat of the prisoner would then be slit with a knife.

Along with drawing and quartering (sometimes, but not always, after a hanging), mazzatello was reserved for crimes that were considered "especially loathsome".

A variation of this method appears in chapter 35 of  Alexandre Dumas' novel The Count of Monte Cristo as la mazzolata and mazzolato, when a prisoner sentenced to execution is bludgeoned on the side of his head with a mace.

See also 
 Beatrice Cenci, beheaded for patricide, whose brother Giacomo was executed by mazzatello for the same crime.

Notes

Execution methods
Papal States